Tiki-Waka is a steel family roller coaster located at Walibi Belgium in Wavre, Belgium. The Polynesian-themed coaster opened for the 2018 season as the headlining attraction in the newly re-themed Exotic World area, and kickstarted a multi-year, €100,000 expansion plan.

History
In June 2017, Walibi announced a major multi-year plan to redesign and transform the park, with an accumulated total of €100,000,000 to be invested on new rides and parkwide theming. This would be kickstarted with the addition of a new family coaster, to be built near the Challenge of Tutankhamon Dark ride at the south end of the park and include an exotic theme. Construction of the new coaster and revitalization of the surrounding area would require the removal of the existing Coccinelle children's coaster, which would be refurbished and rebuilt on the site of the former Ferris wheel, beside the Loup-Garou wooden coaster, for the 2022 season and receive a New Orleans theme.

The Coccinelle had its final day of operations on September 11, 2017, and was dismantled immediately, with the station being razed and site preparation beginning shortly after. During the park's annual Walibi Belgium Fan Day event, on October 21, 2017, an animation of the ride's draft layout was screened for attendees, confirming the coaster to be a Gerstlauer custom Bobsled Coaster creation. Construction continued at a rapid pace throughout the winter, and on February 15, 2018, park officials announced the ride's name to be Tiki-Waka at a press conference by the ride's construction site, where concept artwork for the ride trains were also revealed. The 2018 investments, which included an expansion of the Aqualibi Waterpark, were confirmed to have cost the park roughly €12,000,000 of their planned €100 million masterplan, with the Exotic World tallying around 7.8 million euros of that figure.

Construction on Tiki-Waka was completed on March 1, 2018. Despite the park's best efforts to have the ride ready to begin public operations by a target date of March 31, 2018, a Facebook announcement from the park eventually confirmed on March 21 that such would not be the case. The coaster began public operations on April 7, 2018, in the form of a soft-opening.

Characteristics

Statistics
The coaster runs up to 5 cars of 4 riders each, who are arranged in two rows of two, resulting in a maximum capacity of 600 riders per hour. The ride layout interacts heavily with the surrounding pathways, the Tiki Trail attraction, and the Gold River Adventure boat ride.

Model
Tiki-Waka was designed and manufactured by Bavaria-based manufacturer Gerstlauer, who had worked on the refurbishment of the park's Psyké Underground coaster for the 2013 season and designed the Pégase Express coaster at Parc Astérix, another park owned by Walibi operator Compagnie des Alpes. The coaster is a part of Gerstlauer's family of Bobsled Coasters, which are widely seen as highly customizable wild mouse roller coasters.

Draft Layout
Animated footage of the ride first screened by Walibi and ride manufacturer Gerstlauer consisted of a similar, albeit vastly different, coaster layout that has been said to be a draft of the attraction during its design stage, prior to the confirmation of its final layout. This draft layout featured the same set of elements, albeit arranged in a contrasting order, with multiple helixes being present. The final, and current layout, follows a more straightforwards and distinct path, and the modified sections heavily interact with the Tiki Trail attraction.

Theme
The ride is part of the new-for-2018 Exotic World park area, which features a distinct Polynesian theme. Tiki-Waka spoofs a tropical race car theme, and the surrounding area is decorated with lush vegetation and carved wooden textures. The station was built with real Robinia wood from the Robinieae family of trees. Walibi Belgium hired Dutch design firm Jora Vision to design the area's immersive theme. The company had previously worked on projects such as Psyké Underground's new them overhaul in 2013 and the park's Pulsar water coaster in 2016.

Soundtrack
The official Tiki-Waka soundtrack was produced by German music composition company IMAscore, who had first worked on a soundtrack for Pulsar in 2016, and would score hour-long compositions for the park's rebranded Karma World and Fun World areas in 2019.

Ride experience
Upon cresting the top, the car traverses an initial short drop and a trick-track over the pathway, and makes an uphill right hand turn into the first of many Block brake sections. A hairpin turn leads into another drop over the pathways, followed by a twisted airtime hill and a gradual right-hand turnaround composing of a brief outwards banked twist before hitting the second block brake. A trig-zag descent takes riders close to the ground and under the Tiki Trail treehouse attraction. The car scopes up into another large twisted airtime hill and dives under the Tiki Trail once more before popping up into the third block brake. Riders make a sudden right-hand turn and barge into the ride finale; a trio of camelback hills and a tight 270° helix over the nearby pond before plunging into the final brake run. A simple left-hand turn at 90° leads back into the station, and riders disembark the ride vehicles. The ride lasts approximately 1 minute and 50 seconds.

References

External links
Tiki-Waka at Gerstlauer

Roller coasters in Belgium